The Reich Party of the German Middle Class, known from 1920 to 1925 as the Economic Party of the German Middle Classes, was a conservative German political party during the Weimar Republic. It was commonly known as the Wirtschaftspartei or WP.

Development
Following the establishment of the Weimar Republic the German National People's Party (DNVP), which emerged as the main conservative party, hoped to include Germany's established bourgeoisie as a natural part of its own support base. This however was not to the case, as the party quickly became associated with general rural interests as well as those of big business and as a result the WP was formed in 1920 to be the party of these Mittelstand views. In order to reflect the views of this group, the WP called for a reduction in government economic involvement, a freer hand for business and lower tax. Close to the Central Association of House and Property Owners, it was particularly opposed to revaluation, which it considered an attack on the rights of property owners. The WP did not dominate as the middle class vote, as some did go with either the DNVP or one of the two liberal parties, whilst others preferred more radical right alternatives, but generally the WP emerged as the main group to specifically target the middle classes for its support.

Its first representation was in the Landtag of Prussia in 1921 and it appeared in the Reichstag in 1924. Its best performance in a national election came in 1930 when it won 23 seats. This total reduced to two only two years later by which time it had lost most of its support to the Nazi Party.

Saxony
The party enjoyed its strongest following in Saxony during the 1920s and when it first contested the Landtag of Saxony elections in 1924 it received 7.9% of the vote in Chemnitz-Zwickau, the only district in which it stood.

In 1926 the party co-operated with the German People's Party, DNVP and the Reich Party for Civil Rights and Deflation in a pact against "red parties" in Saxony, arguing that the left was using that state to launch its assault on the Weimar Republic in order to establish communism in Germany. The pact was not a success however as a Social Democratic Party of Germany government took office in the state and before the WP was squabbling with their Reich Party allies over the issue of property revaluation (which WP opposed and the Reich Party supported).

Nonetheless, their support in Saxony was reflected in the 1928 Reichstag election, where the party's 8.5% vote share was by some distance their highest in the country. This fell to 7.3% in 1930 and to as low as 1% in July 1932 by which the WP, which had flirted with anti-parliamentary rhetoric and corporatism, saw its support transfer to the Nazi Party in Saxony as was the case elsewhere.

References

Political parties in the Weimar Republic
Conservative parties in Germany
Anti-communist parties